The New York Mets are a Major League Baseball (MLB) franchise based in Flushing, Queens, in New York City. They play in the National League East division. The first game of the new baseball season for a team is played on Opening Day, and being named the Opening Day starter is an honor, which is often given to the player who is expected to lead the pitching staff that season, though there are various strategic reasons why a team's best pitcher might not start on Opening Day. The New York Mets have used 27 different Opening Day starting pitchers in their 59 seasons. The 27 starters have a combined Opening Day record of 29 wins, 13 losses (29–13) and 17 no decisions. No decisions are only awarded to the starting pitcher if the game is won or lost after the starting pitcher has left the game.

Tom Seaver holds the Mets' record for most Opening Day starts with 11, and has an Opening Day record of 6–0. He also has the most starts in Shea Stadium, the Mets' home ballpark from 1964 through 2008.  Seaver and Dwight Gooden hold the Mets' record for most Opening Day wins with six each.  Al Jackson and Roger Craig share the worst winning percentage as the Opening Day starting pitcher with a record of 0–2.

From 1968 through 1983, Mets' Opening Day starting pitchers went 16 consecutive years without a loss.  During this period, Tom Seaver won six starts with five no decisions, Craig Swan won two starts, and Jerry Koosman, Pat Zachry and Randy Jones won one start apiece.  Furthermore, in the 31-year period from 1968 through 1998, Mets' Opening Day starting pitchers only lost two games.  During that period, they won 19 games with 10 no decisions.  The only losses during this period were by Mike Torrez in 1984 and by Dwight Gooden in 1990.

Overall, Mets Opening Day starting pitchers have a record of 0–1 at the Polo Grounds, a 12–5 record with five no decisions at Shea Stadium and a 3–0 record with three no decisions at Citi Field.  In addition, although the Mets were nominally the home team in 2000, the game was played in Tokyo Dome in Tokyo, Japan. Mike Hampton started the game in Tokyo and lost, making the Mets' Opening Day starting pitchers' combined home record 15–7, and their away record 14–6. The Mets went on to play in the World Series in 1969, 1973, 1986, 2000 and 2015, and won the 1969 and 1986 World Series championship games. Tom Seaver (1969 and 1973), Dwight Gooden (1986), Mike Hampton (2000) and Bartolo Colón (2015) were the Opening Day starting pitchers when the Mets played in the World Series, and they had a combined Opening Day record of 3–1 with one no decision.

Key

Pitchers

References 
General

Specific

Opening day starters
Lists of Major League Baseball Opening Day starting pitchers